Fepuleai Fa'asavalu Faimata Su'a (born ~1974) is a Samoan politician and Member of the Legislative Assembly of Samoa. He is a member of the FAST Party.

Fepuleai is a businessman. He ran as a candidate for the Tautua Samoa Party in the 2016 election but was unsuccessful. He was first elected to the Legislative Assembly of Samoa in the 2021 Samoan general election, defeating Tautua leader Afualo Wood Salele. A subsequent election petition by Afualo against him was unsuccessful. On 28 July 2021 he was appointed Associate Minister of Police and Fire and Emergency Services.

In August 2022 he was issued a traffic offence notice and fined $100 tala after crashing his ministerial vehicle.

References

Living people
Members of the Legislative Assembly of Samoa
Faʻatuatua i le Atua Samoa ua Tasi politicians
Year of birth missing (living people)